The Neurootological and Equilibriometric Society is a learned society that was founded in 1974 and has its seat in Bad Kissingen (Germany).

Foundation 
The society was founded on May 25, 1974, by an assembly of physicians, medical technologists, and engineers interested in neurootology. Since then, the president has been Claus-Frenz Claussen (University of Wurzburg). From the beginning, multilingual communication was established to facilitate the exchange of views as much as possible. English, French, German, and Spanish were listed in the statutes as official  languages.

Aims 
The association's aim has been to foster clinical neurootology in terms of practice and research, by means of
 Training in preparing and undertaking neurootological diagnosis with special regard to equilibrioception
 Standardization of clinical methods of diagnosis and technical devices
 The publication of a medical journal.

Goals 
Among the goals of the society are not only the evaluation of basic and clinical research but also the promotion of clinical neurootology including its four main fields equilibriometry, audiometry, olfactometry, and gustometry as well as the training of interested doctors and medical assistance personnel.

Training 
Since its foundation, the society has held annual congresses for further training, alternately in Bad Kissingen and other countries.

Publications 
The Neurootology Newsletter as well as the proceedings of the society are used to exchange scientific knowledge within the association. In addition, the society publishes the International Tinnitus Journal.

Honours 
Since 1980, the association has honoured experienced neurootologists who have made an essential contribution to neurootology in research and clinical practice. The scientists who are to be honoured are determined two years in advance by the Members' Assembly during the congresses taking place in Bad Kissingen.

References 
 Claussen, Claus-Frenz: Proceedings of the Neurootological and Equilibriometric Society Reg.. edition m+p - Hamburg and Neu Isenburg, 1976. Publication of the society including scientific papers and the association's charter in English, German, Spanish and French.

External links 
 

Medical and health organisations based in Bavaria
Scientific organizations established in 1974
Otorhinolaryngology organizations